Jerry Bruckheimer Films Inc. (JBF) is an American independent film production company of Jerry Bruckheimer, formed in 1995, after cutting his ties with film producer Don Simpson, before his subsequent death in 1996. It produced blockbuster films such as the Pirates of the Caribbean film series.

Logo 
The production logo of the company shows a tree without leaves, on which leaves appear when struck by lightning.

History 
Longtime producer Jerry Bruckheimer co-founded Don Simpson/Jerry Bruckheimer Films in 1983 with Don Simpson; it was initially an affiliate production company of Paramount Pictures. Don Simpson/Jerry Bruckheimer Films produced such hits as (among others) the franchises Beverly Hills Cop and Bad Boys. After breaking up an alliance with Paramount Pictures, he had moved to The Walt Disney Studios in 1991, and the production company produced such hits for Disney as Crimson Tide (1995) and The Rock (1996).

Jerry Bruckheimer Films was founded in 1995 by Bruckheimer, after he cut ties with former producing partner Don Simpson; its first movie under that branding was Simon West's action thriller movie Con Air (1997), starring Nicolas Cage. The company is currently headquartered in Santa Monica, California. He often produces movies with Walt Disney Pictures and Touchstone Pictures. In 2013, the company shifted ties from Disney to Paramount after 22 years working at the studio. The company subsequently went independent in 2020.

The company also has a television production division Jerry Bruckheimer Television (also Jerry Bruckheimer TV or JBTV), which is best known for producing (among others) the TV franchise CSI and Netflix's urban fantasy superhero TV series Lucifer. In June 2016, the division became an independent outfit, ending a 15-year exclusive deal with Warner Bros. Television Studios. In July 2017, the division signed a contract with CBS Television Studios.

Films

Don Simpson/Jerry Bruckheimer Films (1983–1996)

1980s 
 Flashdance (1983) (co-production with Paramount Pictures)
 Beverly Hills Cop (1984) (co-production with Paramount Pictures)
 Thief of Hearts (1984) (co-production with Paramount Pictures)
 Top Gun (1986) (co-production with Paramount Pictures)
 Beverly Hills Cop II (1987) (co-production with Paramount Pictures)

1990s 
 Days of Thunder (1990) (first logo; co-production with Paramount Pictures)
 The Ref (1994) (co-production with Touchstone Pictures; executive produced)
 Bad Boys (1995) (co-production with Columbia Pictures)
 Crimson Tide (1995) (co-production with Hollywood Pictures)
 Dangerous Minds (1995) (co-production with Hollywood Pictures)
 The Rock (1996) (last film co-produced with Don Simpson before he died post-production; co-production with Hollywood Pictures)

Jerry Bruckheimer Films (1997–)

1990s 
 Con Air (1997) (co-production with Touchstone Pictures)
 Armageddon (1998) (co-production with Touchstone Pictures and Valhalla Motion Pictures)
 Enemy of the State (1998) (co-production with Touchstone Pictures and Scott Free Productions)

2000s 
 Gone in 60 Seconds (2000) (co-production with Touchstone Pictures)
 Coyote Ugly (2000) (co-production with Touchstone Pictures)
 Remember the Titans (2000) (co-production with Walt Disney Pictures and Technical Black Films)
 Pearl Harbor (2001) (co-production with Touchstone Pictures)
 Black Hawk Down (2001) (co-production with Columbia Pictures, Revolution Studios and Scott Free Productions)
 Bad Company (2002) (co-production with Touchstone Pictures and Stillking Productions)
 Kangaroo Jack (2003) (co-production with Warner Bros. Pictures and Castle Rock Entertainment)
 Pirates of the Caribbean: The Curse of the Black Pearl (2003) (co-production with Walt Disney Pictures)
 Bad Boys II (2003) (as Don Simpson/Jerry Bruckheimer Films; co-production with Columbia Pictures)
 Veronica Guerin (2003) (co-production with Touchstone Pictures)
 King Arthur (2004) (co-production with Touchstone Pictures, World 2000 Entertainment and Green Hills Productions)
 National Treasure (2004) (co-production with Walt Disney Pictures, Junction Entertainment and Saturn Films)
 Glory Road (2006) (co-production with Walt Disney Pictures, Texas Western Productions and Glory Road Productions)
 Pirates of the Caribbean: Dead Man's Chest (2006) (co-production with Walt Disney Pictures)
 Déjà Vu (2006) (co-production with Touchstone Pictures and Scott Free Productions)
 Pirates of the Caribbean: At World's End (2007) (co-production with Walt Disney Pictures)
 National Treasure: Book of Secrets (2007) (co-production with Walt Disney Pictures, Junction Entertainment and Saturn Films)
 Confessions of a Shopaholic (2009) (co-production with Touchstone Pictures)
 G-Force (2009) (co-production with Walt Disney Pictures)

2010s 
 Prince of Persia: The Sands of Time (2010) (co-production with Walt Disney Pictures)
 The Sorcerer's Apprentice (2010) (co-production with Walt Disney Pictures, Saturn Films and Broken Road Productions)
 Pirates of the Caribbean: On Stranger Tides (2011) (co-production with Walt Disney Pictures)
 The Lone Ranger (2013) (co-production with Walt Disney Pictures, Infinitum Nihil and Blind Wink Productions)
 Deliver Us from Evil (2014) (co-production with Screen Gems)
 Pirates of the Caribbean: Dead Men Tell No Tales (2017) (co-production with Walt Disney Pictures)
 12 Strong (2018) (co-production with Warner Bros. Pictures, Lionsgate, Alcon Entertainment, Black Label Media and Torridon Films)
 Gemini Man (2019) (co-production with Paramount Pictures, Skydance Media, Fosun Pictures and Alibaba Pictures)

2020s 
 Bad Boys for Life (2020) (as Don Simpson/Jerry Bruckheimer Films; co-production with Columbia Pictures, 2.0 Entertainment and Overbrook Entertainment)
 Top Gun: Maverick (2022) (as Don Simpson/Jerry Bruckheimer Films; co-production with Paramount Pictures and Skydance Media)
 Secret Headquarters (2022) (co-production with Paramount Pictures and Paramount+)

Upcoming films 
 Young Woman and the Sea (TBA) (co-production with Walt Disney Pictures and Disney+)
 Beyblade (TBA) (co-production with Paramount Pictures and Hasbro)
 Beverly Hills Cop: Axel Foley (TBA) (as Don Simpson/Jerry Bruckheimer  Films; co-production with Paramount Pictures, Skydance Media and Netflix)
 The Ministry of Ungentlemanly Warfare (TBA) (co-production with Lionsgate Films)

Television

TV series 
 CSI: Crime Scene Investigation (2000–15) (CBS) (co-production with  Alliance Atlantis (2000–08) (seasons 1–8), CBS Productions (2000–06, 2015–16) (seasons 1–6, spin-off), CBS Paramount Network Television (2006–09) (seasons 7–9) and CBS Television Studios (2009–15) (seasons 10–15))
 CSI: Miami (2002–12) (CBS) (co-production with Alliance Atlantis (2002–08) (seasons 1–6), CBS Productions (2002–06) (seasons 1–4), CBS Paramount Network Television (2006–09) (seasons 5–7), CBS Television Studios (2009–12) (seasons 8–10))
 Without a Trace (2002–09) (CBS) (co-production with CBS Productions (2002–06) (seasons 1–4), CBS Paramount Network Television (2006–09) (seasons 5–7) and Warner Bros. Television)
 Skin (2003–05) (Fox (episodes 1–3) and SOAPnet (episodes 4–8)) (co-production with Hoosier Karma Productions and Warner Bros. Television)
 Cold Case (2003–10) (CBS) (co-production with  CBS Productions (2003–06) (seasons 1–3), CBS Paramount Network Television (2006–09) (seasons 4–6), CBS Television Studios (2009–10) (season 7) and Warner Bros. Television)
 CSI: NY (2004–13) (CBS) (co-production with Alliance Atlantis (2004–08) (seasons 1–4), CBS Productions (2004–06) (seasons 1–2), CBS Paramount Network Television (2006–09) (seasons 3–5) and CBS Television Studios (2009–13) (seasons 6–9))
 E-Ring (2005–06) (NBC) (co-production with Warner Bros. Television)
 Just Legal (2005–06) (The WB) (co-production with Warner Bros. Television)
 Close to Home (2005-2007) (CBS) (co-production with Warner Bros. Television)
 Justice (2006–07) (Fox) (co-production with Warner Bros. Television)
 Modern Men (2006) (The WB) (co-production with Marsh McCall Productions and Warner Bros. Television)
 Eleventh Hour (2008–09) (CBS) (co-production with Granada America and Warner Bros. Television)
 The Forgotten (2009–10) (ABC) (co-production with Warner Bros. Television Distribution and Warner Bros. Television)
 Chase (2010–11) (NBC) (co-production with Warner Bros. Television Distribution and Warner Bros. Television)
 Miami Medical (2010) (CBS) (co-production with Skim Milk Productions and Warner Bros. Television)
 Take the Money and Run (2011) (ABC) (co-production with Horizon Alternative Television and Profiles Television Productions)
 Hostages (2013–14) (CBS) (co-production with Nana.10.Co.il and Warner Bros. Television)
 CSI: Cyber (2015–16) (CBS) (co-production with  CBS Productions)
 Lucifer (2016–2021) (Fox (2016–2018) and Netflix (2019–2021)) (co-production with DC Entertainment and Warner Bros. Television)
 Training Day (2017) (CBS) (co-production with Warner Bros. Television)
 L.A.'s Finest (2019–20) (Spectrum Originals) (credited as Don Simpson/Jerry Bruckheimer Films; co-production with 2.0 Entertainment, The Brandons, Green Eggs and Pam Productions, and Sony Pictures Television)
 Council of Dads (2020) (NBC) (co-production with Midwest Livestock Productions and Universal Television)
 Hightown (2020–present) (Starz)
 CSI: Vegas (2021–present) (CBS) (co-production with Trace Pictures and CBS Studios)
 American Gigolo (2022–present) (Showtime) (co-production with Three Rivers Entertainment and Paramount Television Studios)
 Fire Country (2022–present) (CBS) (co-production with CBS Studios)
 National Treasure: Edge of History (2022) (Disney+) (co-production with ABC Signature)

TV movies 
 Max Q (1998) (co-production with Touchstone Television)
 Swing Vote (1999) (co-production with Columbia TriStar Television)

References

External links 
 

Film production companies of the United States
American independent film studios
Entertainment companies based in California
American companies established in 1995
Companies based in Santa Monica, California
Entertainment companies established in 1995
1995 establishments in California